The 2018–19 UEFA Europa League group stage began on 20 September and ended on 13 December 2018. A total of 48 teams competed in the group stage to decide 24 of the 32 places in the knockout phase of the 2018–19 UEFA Europa League.

Draw
The draw for the group stage was held on 31 August 2018, 13:00 CEST, at the Grimaldi Forum in Monaco.

The 48 teams were drawn into twelve groups of four, with the restriction that teams from the same association could not be drawn against each other. For the draw, the teams were seeded into four pots based on their 2018 UEFA club coefficients.

On 17 July 2014, the UEFA emergency panel ruled that Ukrainian and Russian clubs would not be drawn against each other "until further notice" due to the political unrest between the countries.

Moreover, the draw was controlled for teams from the same association in order to split the teams evenly into the two sets of six groups (A–F, G–L) for maximum television coverage. On each matchday, one set of six groups played their matches at 18:55 CET/CEST, while the other set of six groups played their matches at 21:00 CET/CEST, with the two sets of groups alternating between each matchday. The following pairings were announced by UEFA after the group stage teams were confirmed:

Spain: Real Betis and Sevilla
Germany: Eintracht Frankfurt and RB Leipzig
England: Chelsea and Arsenal
Italy: Lazio and Milan
France: Marseille and Bordeaux
Russia: Spartak Moscow and Zenit Saint Petersburg
Ukraine: Dynamo Kyiv and Vorskla Poltava
Belgium: Standard Liège and Anderlecht
Turkey: Fenerbahçe and Beşiktaş
Czech Republic: Slavia Prague and Jablonec
Greece: PAOK and Olympiacos
Austria: Red Bull Salzburg and Rapid Wien
Scotland: Celtic and Rangers
Cyprus: AEK Larnaca and Apollon Limassol
Norway: Rosenborg and Sarpsborg 08

The fixtures were decided after the draw, using a computer draw not shown to public, with the following match sequence (Regulations Article 15.02):

Note: Positions for scheduling do not use the seeding pots, e.g., Team 1 is not necessarily the team from Pot 1 in the draw.

There were scheduling restrictions: for example, teams from the same city (e.g., Arsenal and Chelsea) in general were not scheduled to play at home on the same matchday (to avoid them playing at home on the same day, due to logistics and crowd control), and teams from "winter countries" (e.g., Russia) were not scheduled to play at home on the last matchday (due to cold weather).

Teams
Below were the participating teams (with their 2018 UEFA club coefficients), grouped by their seeding pot. They included:
17 teams which entered in the group stage
21 winners of the play-off round (8 from Champions Path, 13 from Main Path)
6 losers of the Champions League play-off round (4 from Champions Path, 2 from League Path)
4 League Path losers of the Champions League third qualifying round

Notes

Format
In each group, teams played against each other home-and-away in a round-robin format. The group winners and runners-up advanced to the round of 32, where they were joined by the eight third-placed teams of the Champions League group stage.

Tiebreakers

Teams were ranked according to points (3 points for a win, 1 point for a draw, 0 points for a loss), and if tied on points, the following tiebreaking criteria were applied, in the order given, to determine the rankings (Regulations Articles 16.01):
Points in head-to-head matches among tied teams;
Goal difference in head-to-head matches among tied teams;
Goals scored in head-to-head matches among tied teams;
Away goals scored in head-to-head matches among tied teams;
If more than two teams were tied, and after applying all head-to-head criteria above, a subset of teams were still tied, all head-to-head criteria above were reapplied exclusively to this subset of teams;
Goal difference in all group matches;
Goals scored in all group matches;
Away goals scored in all group matches;
Wins in all group matches;
Away wins in all group matches;
Disciplinary points (red card = 3 points, yellow card = 1 point, expulsion for two yellow cards in one match = 3 points);
UEFA club coefficient.

Groups
The matchdays were 20 September, 4 October, 25 October, 8 November, 29 November, and 13 December 2018. The scheduled kickoff times were 18:55 and 21:00 CET/CEST, except for a few matches whose kickoff times were 16:50 CET/CEST.

Times are CET/CEST, as listed by UEFA (local times, if different, are in parentheses).

Group A

Group B

Group C

Group D

Group E

Group F

Group G

Group H

Group I

Group J

Group K

Group L

Notes

References

External links

2
2018-19
September 2018 sports events in Europe
October 2018 sports events in Europe
November 2018 sports events in Europe
December 2018 sports events in Europe